Admestina tibialis is a species of jumping spider. The species was first described in 1846 by C. L. Koch. These spiders are found in eastern United States from Florida to Connecticut.

References

tibialis
Spiders of the United States
Spiders described in 1846